Gaultheria lanigera is a species of Gaultheria, native to the Andes in Colombia and Ecuador. It is an evergreen shrub, confined to high altitudes.

There are two varieties:
Gaultheria lanigera var. lanigera. Recorded from Ecuador.
Gaultheria lanigera var. rufolanata (Sleumer) Luteyn. Recorded from Colombia.

References
New York Botanical Garden herbarium: Gaultheria lanigera specimen list
UNEP-WCMC Species Database: Gaultheria lanigera

lanigera